Urostemon is a genus of flowering plants belonging to the family Asteraceae. The genus is monotypic, being represented by the single species Urostemon kirkii found in New Zealand. Endemic to North Island, usually growing as a small epiphytic bush. It is classified as nationally vulnerable.

References

Senecioneae
Monotypic Asteraceae genera